"Dreaming" is a single by Aurora with vocals by Lizzy Pattinson. It reached number 24 on the UK Singles Chart in 2002.

Music video
There were two video versions for the single. One features Lizzy on a charter bus and singing with an acoustic band.

The other version features Lizzy in a room with mahogany flooring and ceiling. She is singing with a band.

Track listing
UK CDS (2002)
 Dreaming (3:56)
 Ordinary World (Acoustic Version) (4:37)
 Hear You Calling (Acoustic Version) (3:47)

UK 12" Vinyl (2002)
Dreaming (Lullaby Mix) 
Dreaming (Stella Browne Dub Mix) 
  
UK 12" Vinyl Promo (2002)
Dreaming (LTI Mix) 
Dreaming (LTI Instrumental Dub Mix) 
Dreaming (LTI Radio Edit)

UK DVD Single (2002)
Dreaming (The Video) 
Dreaming (Radio Edit) 
Aurora Album Medley (In My Skin, Your Mistake, The Day It Rained Forever, This Can't Be Love) 
Dreaming (Lullaby Mix)

External links
Ordinary World at Discogs

Aurora (electronica band) songs
2002 singles
2002 songs
Songs written by Steve Robson